The 2022 Arab Handball Championship of Champions will be the 37. edition of the Arab Handball Championship of Champions which is for the first time a qualifying tournament for the 2022 IHF Men's Super Globe. It will be held in Hammamet, Tunisia from 17 to 27 September 2022.

Teams
Following teams were already qualified for the tournament.

Results
All times are local (UTC+1).

Group A

Group B

Knockout stage

Bracket

Quarterfinals

Semifinals

Seventh place game

Fifth place game

Third place game

Final

Final standing

References

Weblinks
Result page (French)

2022
Arab Handball Championship of Champions
Arab Handball Championship of Champions
International handball competitions hosted by Tunisia
Arab Handball Championship of Champions